Valentín Massana Gracia (born 5 July 1970 in Viladecans) is a Spanish race walker, and the Spanish national record holder in the men's 50 km walk (3:38:43) in Ourense, March 20, 1994.

Achievements

Notes

References

External links

 
 
 
 

1970 births
Living people
Spanish male racewalkers
Athletes from Catalonia
Athletes (track and field) at the 1992 Summer Olympics
Athletes (track and field) at the 1996 Summer Olympics
Athletes (track and field) at the 2000 Summer Olympics
Olympic athletes of Spain
Olympic bronze medalists for Spain
World Athletics Championships medalists
European Athletics Championships medalists
Olympic bronze medalists in athletics (track and field)
World Athletics Championships winners
Medalists at the 1996 Summer Olympics